Mustanina is a village in Narva-Jõesuu, Ida-Viru County in northeastern Estonia.

References

Villages in Ida-Viru County